Glyphodes amphipeda is a moth in the family Crambidae. It was described by Edward Meyrick in 1939. It is found in Namibia.

References

Endemic fauna of Namibia
Moths described in 1939
Glyphodes